Sant Aniol de Finestres is a municipality in the comarca of Garrotxa in Girona, Catalonia, Spain.

Villages
La Barroca, 15
Sant Esteve de Llémena, 221 
Sant Aniol de Finestres, 55

References

 Panareda Clopés, Josep Maria; Rios Calvet, Jaume; Rabella Vives, Josep Maria (1989). Guia de Catalunya, Barcelona: Caixa de Catalunya.  (Spanish).  (Catalan).

External links 

Pàgina web de l'Ajuntament
 Government data pages 

Municipalities in Garrotxa
Populated places in Garrotxa